Mourilyan was an electoral district of the Legislative Assembly in the Australian state of Queensland from 1950 to 1992.

First created for the 1950 state election, the district was based in north Queensland, centred on the town of Mourilyan, taking in areas previously belonging to the abolished district of Herbert.

Mourilyan was abolished by the 1991 redistribution, necessitated by the one vote one value reforms, taking effect at the 1992 state election. Its territory was divided between the neighbouring districts of Hinchinbrook and Tablelands.

Members for Mourilyan

Election results

See also
 Electoral districts of Queensland
 Members of the Queensland Legislative Assembly by year
 :Category:Members of the Queensland Legislative Assembly by name

References

Former electoral districts of Queensland
1950 establishments in Australia
1992 establishments in Australia
Constituencies established in 1950
Constituencies disestablished in 1992